Andrea Feola (born 26 June 1992) is an Italian football player. He plays for Barletta.

Club career
He made his Serie B debut for Trapani on 8 September 2013 in a game against Empoli.

On 29 August 2019, he signed with Casarano.

On 10 September 2021, he joined Casertana in Serie D.

References

External links
 

1992 births
Living people
Italian footballers
Association football midfielders
Trapani Calcio players
S.S. Arezzo players
Olbia Calcio 1905 players
S.S.C. Bari players
Casertana F.C. players
Serie B players
Serie C players
Serie D players
Footballers from Sardinia